Giovanni Formiconi (born 14 December 1989) is an Italian professional footballer who plays as a defender for  club Taranto.

Club career
In January 2008 Formiconi joined Serie A team Udinese Calcio, at first on loan. Since mid-2009 he moved back to Lega Pro divisions on temporary basis, along with Daniel Bradaschia in 2009–10. In June 2010 Lumezzane excised the rights to sign both players but Udinese excised the counter-option on Formiconi. He then left for Benevento.

On 23 June 2011 Benevento announced that they did not excised the rights to sign Formiconi. On 8 July 2011 he left for Grosseto along with Federico Gerardi and Francesco Bossa.

On 22 July 2016, he was signed by Bassano.

On 18 August 2020 he signed with Gubbio.

International career
Formiconi represented Italy at the 2008 UEFA European Under-19 Football Championship

References

External links
 
 Football.it Profile  

1989 births
Living people
Footballers from Genoa
Italian footballers
Association football defenders
Serie B players
Serie C players
Atletico Roma F.C. players
Udinese Calcio players
F.C. Lumezzane V.G.Z. A.S.D. players
Benevento Calcio players
F.C. Grosseto S.S.D. players
U.S. Cremonese players
Bassano Virtus 55 S.T. players
Pordenone Calcio players
U.S. Triestina Calcio 1918 players
A.S. Gubbio 1910 players
Taranto F.C. 1927 players
Italy youth international footballers